Bill Brown (born July 30, 1951) is the Former head men's basketball coach at California University of Pennsylvania.  He previously held the same position at California State University, Sacramento. and served as an assistant at multiple Division I institutions throughout his career.</p>
William Harris “Bill” Brown, Kenyon’s head men’s basketball coach from 1988 to 1996, died Wednesday, Feb. 15, in Rostraver Township, Pennsylvania. He was 71 years old.

References

1951 births
Living people
Basketball coaches from Ohio
Arkansas Razorbacks men's basketball coaches
Basketball players from Ohio
College men's basketball head coaches in the United States
Kent State Golden Flashes men's basketball coaches
Kenyon Lords basketball coaches
Ohio Bobcats men's basketball coaches
Ohio Bobcats men's basketball players
Sacramento State Hornets men's basketball coaches
Sportspeople from Toledo, Ohio
Tennessee Volunteers basketball coaches